Olga Avigail Mieleszczuk  is a singer, accordion player and researcher of Eastern European musical folklore, known for singing Ashkenazi Jewish songs in Yiddish.  In 2012 Olga Mieleszczuk converted to Orthodox Judaism, acquired the first name Avigail and now she lives in Israel.

Olga Mieleszczuk was born in Warsaw to a Polish Catholic family. She received B.A. in classical music from the Chopin University of Music, Warsaw and M.S. in cultural anthropology from the University of Warsaw.  After enrolling in a course on Yiddish music by Warsaw's Shalom Foundation, she focused on Ashkenazi Jewish music, especially from the Eastern Borderlands of Poland,  she studied Chassidic music, Yiddish folk songs, as well as Jewish songs in various languages. Her interest in Jewish culture was sparked by an interfaith visit to Auschwitz.

Her major musical projects were Jewish Polesye, Li-La-Lo (based on the Yiddish-language cabarets of Poland (called kleynkunst) and Tel Aviv) and Jewish Tango.

Her husband Shlomi is of Kurdish descent and they have two children.

Albums
2012: Jewish Folksongs From The Shtetl
2017: Yiddish Tango Live in Jerusalem (with Tango Attack Band )
2021: Songs From The Bible Times Till Today

References

External links
Olga Mieleszczuk website

Year of birth missing (living people)
Living people
21st-century Israeli women singers
Israeli Ashkenazi Jews
Yiddish-language singers
Polish emigrants to Israel
Converts to Orthodox Judaism
Converts to Judaism from Roman Catholicism
Jewish women singers
Orthodox Jewish women musicians
Polish Ashkenazi Jews